Frank L. Smith  (1857–1928), was a Major League Baseball player who played catcher for the 1884 Pittsburgh Alleghenys.

External links

1857 births
1928 deaths
19th-century baseball players
Canadian expatriate baseball players in the United States
Major League Baseball catchers
Pittsburgh Alleghenys players
Saginaw Greys players
Toledo Avengers players
Toronto (minor league baseball) players
Major League Baseball players from Canada